Rant n' Rave with the Stray Cats is the third studio album by American rockabilly band Stray Cats, released on August 15, 1983 by EMI America. It was produced by Dave Edmunds. The album featured the No. 5 hit "(She's) Sexy + 17", Top 40 hit "I Won't Stand in Your Way" (#35) and "Look At That Cadillac" (#68).

Critical reception 
In a contemporary review for The Village Voice, music critic Robert Christgau gave the album a "B−" and said that its "bigger and rawer" sound was an improvement over "Built for Speeds prettification", but felt that, despite his improved guitar playing, Brian Setzer was a poor songwriter and "a preening panderer, mythologizing his rockin' '50s with all the ignorant cynicism of a punk poser". In a retrospective review for AllMusic, Stephen Thomas Erlewine said that the album "sounded identical" to Built for Speed and was just as strong because of the hits "(She's) Sexy + 17" and "I Won't Stand in Your Way".

Track listing
All tracks composed by Brian Setzer; except where indicated
"Rebels Rule"
"Too Hip, Gotta Go"
"Look at That Cadillac"
"Something's Wrong With My Radio" (Setzer, Slim Jim Phantom, Lee Rocker)
"18 Miles to Memphis"
"(She's) Sexy + 17"
"Dig Dirty Doggie"
"I Won't Stand in Your Way"
"Hotrod Gang"
"How Long You Wanna Live, Anyway?" (Setzer, Slim Jim Phantom, Lee Rocker)
"Lucky Charm (Ooh Wee Suzy)" (Japan Release Bonus Track)

Personnel
Brian Setzer - guitar, vocals
Lee Rocker - bass, vocals
Slim Jim Phantom - drums
14 Karat Soul - background vocals
Mel Collins - saxophone
Geraint Watkins - piano
David Thurmond - background vocals
Russell Fox II - background vocals
Gavin Cochrane - Photography

Charts

References

1983 albums
Stray Cats albums
EMI America Records albums
Albums produced by Dave Edmunds